Myron Alan White (August 1, 1957 – August 4, 2018) was an American baseball player who played as an outfielder for the Los Angeles Dodgers during the 1978 season.

White was a running back at Santa Ana Valley High School.  He rushed for 4,194 yards in his high school career, an Orange County record at the time.

The Dodgers drafted White in the second round in 1975, and gave him a signing bonus of $60,000: he had been offered a football scholarship by UCLA.  He played in the Dodgers' minor league system from 1975 to 1981.

White was married briefly and had three daughters.  His mother, who outlived him, said that he was unable to work for many years because of health problems.

White died from complications relating to diabetes on August 4, 2018, in Cabazon, California.

References

External links
, or Retrosheet

1957 births
2018 deaths
African-American baseball players
Major League Baseball outfielders
Los Angeles Dodgers players
Baseball players from Long Beach, California
Bellingham Dodgers players
Danville Dodgers players
Lodi Dodgers players
San Antonio Dodgers players
Albuquerque Dukes players
20th-century African-American sportspeople
21st-century African-American people